Pinacia is a genus of moths of the family Erebidae. The genus was erected by Jacob Hübner in 1831.

Species
Pinacia albistella (Walker, [1866]) Peninsular Malaysia, Sumatra, Nias, Borneo, Java, Bail, Philippines (Palawan, Mindanao)
Pinacia albolineata Snellen, [1886] Sumatra
Pinacia molybdaenalis Hübner, [1831] Java, Borneo, Sumatra, Lesser Sundas - Tanimbar, Sulawesi
Pinacia novoguineana (Bethune-Baker, 1906) New Guinea
Pinacia ocellata (Bethune-Baker, 1908) New Guinea

References

Herminiinae